Simon Thomas Court is a New Zealand politician. He became a Member of Parliament in the New Zealand parliament at the 2020 general election as a representative of the ACT New Zealand party.

Early life and career
Court went to Auckland Grammar School and then attended Unitec to study civil engineering. He has public and private sector experience and worked in Auckland, Wellington and Fiji. For Auckland City Council, he worked as a civil and environmental engineer, and before entering parliament, he was running his own engineering firm.

In 2016 and 2017, Court worked for engineering consultancy MWH Global in Fiji. The consultancy lost its contract with the Fiji Roads Authority on alleged pay disputes and Court and one other employee were deported from Fiji. According to Court, the deportation was in response to him speaking out about Chinese Communist party contractors' workmanship. Fiji Roads Authority reportedly "accused MWH of extortion, breaking contract, and damaging the country", but Court disputed this, saying he did not see any evidence of that.

Political career

Court stated in 2020 that he had supported the ACT Party for just over two decades, but also that he had voted Green twice. He joined ACT after going to a party event in December 2019.

He did not win the electorate, coming fourth with 1610 votes, but ACT won 7.6% of the party vote, which entitled it to 10 MPs, including Court. He is ACT's spokesperson for the Environment, Climate Change, Infrastructure, Transport, Local Government, and Energy and Resources.

Personal life
Court has three teenage sons, the youngest of whom has Down syndrome. He cites his youngest son as one of the main reasons for entering Parliament.

References

Living people
ACT New Zealand MPs
Members of the New Zealand House of Representatives
New Zealand list MPs
Year of birth missing (living people)